Dai Qinhua (born 7 September 1985 in Anshan, Liaoning) is a Chinese football player.

Club career
Dai Qinhua started his senior career with top tier club Shenyang Ginde in the 2003 Chinese league season where he made nine appearances within his debut season. For the next several seasons he would become a regular squad player and be part of the team that moved to Changsha and renamed themselves Changsha Ginde. After six years despite being considered a talented player he couldn't establish himself within the club and after only 37 league appearances Dai was allowed to move to second tier club Hunan Billows in February 2010.

In January 2013, Dai Qinhua signed with Chinese League One club Shenyang Shenbei on a free transfer.

In 2015, Dai signed for Shenyang Urban.

International career
Dai was a member of the Chinese Olympic team and was expected to appear in the 2008 Summer Olympic, however he was dropped from the team due to ligament damage.

References

External links
Player profile at Sodasoccer.com

1985 births
Living people
Sportspeople from Anshan
Chinese footballers
Footballers from Liaoning
Changsha Ginde players
Hunan Billows players
Chinese Super League players
China League One players
Association football midfielders
21st-century Chinese people